Carabus punctatus is a species of ground beetle from the family Carabidae. They are black coloured and are very similar to Carabus piochardi.

References

punctatus
Beetles described in 1835